The Georges Giralt PhD Award is a European scientific prize for extraordinary contributions in robotics. It is yearly awarded at the European Robotics Forum by euRobotics AISBL, a non-profit organisation based in Brussels with the objective to turn robotics beneficial for Europe’s economy and society.

Georges Giralt received his PhD in 1958, from the Paul Sabatier University, in the domain of electrical machines, and soon afterwards became  a pioneer in robotics, in Europe and worldwide. He was especially instrumental in bringing in scientific foundations and methodology when the domain was still young, and a loose coupling of mechanical and electrical engineering, adopting the early results of automatic control.

The high reputation of the Georges Giralt PhD Award is based on the prominent role of the awarding institution euRobotics. With more than 250 member organisations, euRobotics represents the academic and industrial robotics community in Europe. Moreover, it provides the European robotics community with a legal entity to engage in a public/private partnership with the European Commission.

Entitled for participation for the Georges Giralt PhD Award are all robotics-related dissertations which have been successfully defended at a European university.

The US-American counterpart is the Dick Volz Award.

Award winners 
 2022 Antonio Loquercio, Michael Lutter
 2021 Giuseppe Averta, Bernd Henze
 2020 Cosimo Della Santina
 2019 Grazioso Stanislao, Teodor Tomic
 2018 Frank Bonnet, Daniel Leidner
 2017 Johannes Englsberger
 2016 Alexander Dietrich, Mark Müller
 2015 Jörg Stückler
 2014 Manuel Catalano, Fabien Expert, Rainer Jaekel
 2013 Jens Kober
 2012 Sami Haddadin
 2011 Mario Pratts
 2010 Ludovic Righetti
 2009 Alejandro-Dizan Vasquez-Govea
 2008 Cyrill Stachniss
 2007 Pierre Lamon
 2006 Martijn Wisse
 2005 Juan Andrade Cetto
 2004 Gilles Duchemin
 2003 Ralf Koeppe
 2002 Gianluca Antonelli, Jens-Steffen Gutmann

References 

Robotics
European awards